Likely may refer to:

Probability
Likelihood function
Likely (surname)
Likely, British Columbia, Canada, a community
Likely, California, United States, a census-designated place
Likely McBrien (1892-1956), leading Australian rules football administrator in the Victorian Football League
In the nomenclature of political forecasting, a "likely" seat is one that is predicted, but not definitively, to probably be won by a particular political party

See also
Likely Airport (disambiguation)